Swedehome (also written Swede Home) is an unincorporated community in Polk County, Nebraska, United States.

History
A post office was established at Swedehome in 1883, and remained in operation until it was discontinued in 1902. Swedehome was originally built up chiefly by Swedes.

Notable person
Harold LeVander, Governor of Minnesota, was born in Swedehome.

References

Unincorporated communities in Polk County, Nebraska
Unincorporated communities in Nebraska